Mauī John Mitchell (20 May 1941 – 23 September 2021) was a New Zealand historian who specialised in Māori history, particularly in the upper South Island. Of Māori descent, he affiliated to Te Āti Awa and Ngāti Tama. Mitchell completed a master's thesis in 1967, followed by a doctoral thesis in 1971, both at the University of Canterbury.

Selected publications

References

1941 births
2021 deaths
Te Āti Awa people
Ngāti Tama people
People from Tākaka
People educated at Nelson College
University of Canterbury alumni
Academic staff of the University of Canterbury
New Zealand Māori academics
New Zealand psychologists
21st-century New Zealand historians